This is a list of the songs that reached number one in Mexico in 1962, according to Billboard magazine with data provided by Audiomusica.

Chart history

By country of origin
Number-one artists:

Number-one compositions (it denotes the country of origin of the song's composer[s]; in case the song is a cover of another one, the name of the original composition is provided in parentheses):

See also
1962 in music

References

Sources
Print editions of the Billboard magazine from January 6 to December 29, 1962.

1962 in Mexico
Mexico
1962